Bård Magne Pedersen (born 1958) is a Norwegian civil servant and politician.  He served as the acting county governor of Troms county twice.  The first time was from 2005 to 2006 after Vilgunn Gregusson retired, holding the office for when Svein Ludvigsen could take over when he finished his duties as cabinet minister.  The second time was from 2014 until 2017, holding the office for when Elisabeth Aspaker could take over when she finished her duties as cabinet minister.

References

1958 births
Living people
County governors of Norway